La Mansión de Mark Pollack, is a neo-classical, Florentine mansion in the Cubanacan Section (aka the Country Club section) of Havana, Cuba built in 1930 by the Cuban architect, Leonardo Morales y Pedroso (1887–1965). It is located at 21st street #15001, Cubanacan, Havana, Cuba. It was built for Mark Alexander Pollack (1874–1946), the son of Alexander Pollack and Belle A. Rothschild (1848-1936), the American-born patriarch of a wealthy Cuban tobacco exporter. The house covers an area of 13,000 square meters.

Architecture

The mansion is constructed in large part of coral stone. , it has large rooms and is surrounded by extensive gardens. Pollack commissioned a series of panels referring to the discovery of the Americas which were placed around the main hall, but due to their deteriorated state when the Cuban government decided to restore the mansion at a cost of 2 million dollars in the 1990s, were lost. 

The portico has a triple arcade supported by double columns and a decorated and arched ceiling. The central courtyard is exceptional for Cuban house architecture in the 20th century, due to its size and the fact that it is completely surrounded by a porticoed gallery, the columns of which are of different kinds of marble on both floors.

Political refugees
Pollack's family abandoned La Mansion and Cuba in 1960, they moved to Florida as political refugees of the Castro government.

Promotion
The mansion has been featured in Architectural Digest, Six Days in Havana by James A. Michener, in Maria Luisa Lobo Montalvo's "Havana", as the cover picture for Michael Connors' book "Cuban Elegance", as the cover photo for "I Was Cuba: Treasures from the Ramiro Fernandez Collection" by Kevin Kwan, and is featured in dozens of other books celebrating Cuban architecture.

The property was leased to the Brazilian Embassy until Brazil broke relations with the Castro government, after which it was abandoned and allowed to deteriorate. In the 1990s, it was restored at a cost of over $2,000,000 and is now rented by the Cuban government for its important guests.

See also
Instituto Técnico Militar
Leonardo Morales y Pedroso

Notes

References

Bibliography
 Inside Cuba (Taschen, Spain 2006 )
 Havana, Cuba: An Architectural Guide (A.G. Novograf, S.A., 1998)
 Cuban Elegance (Harry N. Abrams, 2004)
 Havana: History and Architecture of a Romantic City (Monacelli Press, 2000)
 La Habana Arquitectura del Siglo XX, Eduardo Luis Rodriguez (Blume, 2001)  

Buildings and structures in Havana
Neoclassical architecture in Cuba